Terrence H. Martin (born January 17, 1936) is an American politician who served in the Alaska House of Representatives from 1979 to 1999.

References

1936 births
Living people
Republican Party members of the Alaska House of Representatives
Politicians from Anchorage, Alaska
Politicians from Baltimore
United States Marines